The Rockcastle River Railway is a now-defunct line created by the Bond Foley lumber company to extract timber from Jackson County, Kentucky.  It intersected the Louisville and Nashville Railroad line at East Bernstadt, Kentucky.

See also
 Wikipedia:WikiProject_Trains/ICC_valuations/Rockcastle_River_Railway

References

Defunct Kentucky railroads